Elections to the French National Assembly were held in the constituency of French Sudan−Niger on 21 October 1945 as part of the wider French elections. Two members were elected from two separate electoral colleges. A second round of voting was held for both colleges on 18 November as no candidate received over 50% of the vote in the first round. Maurice Kaouza and Fily Dabo Sissoko were elected.

Campaign
An attempt to form a unified African bloc for the elections failed due to the number of people seeking to be candidates. Fily Dabo Sissoko became a well-known a writer, and was popular with chiefs, particularly those from animist groups. He campaigned on a platform of equal pay for Africans and Europeans, the abolishment of forced labour and the emancipation of women.

In the second round of the second college elections, opponents of Sissoko have their backing to Mamadou Konaté, a teacher who was well-respected amongst the local intelligentsia.

Results

First College

Second College

Aftermath
Following the elections, Senegalese MP Lamine Guèye attempted to persuade all the African MPs to form an African Bloc, which would be affiliated with the SFIO. However, the attempt failed, and Sissoko joined the MUR.

References

1945 in French Sudan
1945 in Niger
Elections in Niger
Elections in Mali
French Sudan
October 1945 events in Africa
French Sudan